Andrew Dowie is a Canadian politician, who was elected to the Legislative Assembly of Ontario in the 2022 provincial election. He represents the riding of Windsor—Tecumseh as a member of the Progressive Conservative Party of Ontario. He is the first conservative MPP to represent the area in 93 years.

Prior to his election, Dowie was best known in the community as being a town councillor in Tecumseh, Ontario.  He was first elected in 2014 and acclaimed in a redistributed ward in 2018.  Dowie was also recognized as one of "40 Leaders Under 40" by Leadership Windsor-Essex in 2018 and inducted into the Professional Engineers Ontario Order of Honour in 2018

References 

Living people
Progressive Conservative Party of Ontario MPPs
21st-century Canadian politicians
Ontario municipal councillors
People from Essex County, Ontario
Politicians from Windsor, Ontario
1981 births